Ralph Woolsey (January 1, 1914 – March 24, 2018) was an American cinematographer. He won a Primetime Emmy Award in 1968 for his work on It Takes a Thief, after having been nominated twice for the television programs Maverick and 77 Sunset Strip. Woolsey died in March 2018 at the Motion Picture & Television Fund cottages in Woodland Hills, California, at the age of 104.

References

External links 

1914 births
2018 deaths
People from Oregon
American cinematographers
American centenarians
Men centenarians